Arizona Gang Busters is a 1940 American Western film directed by Sam Newfield and written by William Lively. The film stars Tim McCoy, Pauline Haddon, Lou Fulton, Forrest Taylor, Julian Rivero and Arno Frey. The film was released on September 16, 1940, by Producers Releasing Corporation.

Premise
A ring of saboteurs headed by Carl Schmidt is building an arsenal along the US-Mexican border. The US and Mexico send a team of agents to investigate, but when they arrive at the site of an arranged meeting, they discover the men they were to meet have been murdered—and they are arrested for the killings.

Cast      
 Tim McCoy as Trigger Tim Rand
 Pauline Haddon as Sue Lambert
 Lou Fulton as Sidekick Lanky
 Forrest Taylor as Ed Lambert
 Julian Rivero as Captain Rodriguez
 Arno Frey as Carl Schmidt
 Paul Ellis as Henchman Mario
 Kenne Duncan as Sheriff Dan Kirk
 Jack Rutherford as Thorpe
 Elizabeth LaMal as Mrs. Kirk
 Otto Reichow as Henry Hess
 Lita Cortez as Lola

References

External links
 

1940 films
1940s English-language films
American Western (genre) films
1940 Western (genre) films
Producers Releasing Corporation films
Films directed by Sam Newfield
American black-and-white films
Films set in Arizona
Films set in Mexico
1940s American films